This is a list of notable visual artists from, or associated with, Moldova.

A
 Vasile Adam (born 1956), woodwork artist

B
 Ilya Bogdesko (1923–2010), painter
 Grigoriy Bronza (1927–2010), artist and stamp designer

C
 Tudor Cataraga (1956–2010), sculptor

G
 Mihai Grecu (1916–1998), painter

M
 Grégoire Michonze (1902–1982), painter

P
 Mihai Petric (1923-2005), painter
 Alexandru Plămădeală (1888–1940), sculptor

S
 Andrei Sârbu (1950–2000), painter
 Ion Severin, illustrator

T
 Alexander Tinei (born 1967), painter

V
 Igor Vieru (1923–1988), painter
 Gheorghe Vrabie (1939–2016), artist

Z
 Victor Zâmbrea (1924–2000), painter

See also

Moldova
artists
Moldovan artists